The 2005 Musayyib bombing was a suicide attack on a marketplace in Musayyib, Iraq, a town 35 miles south of Baghdad on July 16, 2005.

The attacker had detonated his explosive belt in a crowded marketplace, where hundreds of people had come to shop and mingle after the day's stifling heat subsided. The attack happened as a tanker containing cooking gas was passing, triggering an inferno that destroyed dozens of buildings, including a nearby Shia mosque where worshipers were emerging from evening prayers.

References

External links

THE MUSAYYB BLAST
Death Toll Rises to 100 in Suicide Blast in Iraq The Washington Post

2005 murders in Iraq
Violence against Shia Muslims in Iraq
21st-century mass murder in Iraq
Attacks in Iraq in 2005
Mass murder in 2005
Marketplace attacks in Iraq
Terrorist incidents in Iraq in 2005
Suicide bombings in Iraq
July 2005 events in Iraq
Building bombings in Iraq